Mark MacKenzie is an American politician and labor leader from the state of New Hampshire. MacKenzie, a member of the Democratic Party, serves in the New Hampshire House of Representatives.

MacKenzie joined the Manchester, New Hampshire fire department at age 21 and served for 25 years. He became the president of the New Hampshire chapter of the AFL–CIO in 1989 and served through 2015.

References

External links
 Campaign website

Living people
People from Manchester, New Hampshire
Democratic Party members of the New Hampshire House of Representatives
American firefighters
Year of birth missing (living people)